Walter Flinsch (7 February 1903 – 3 February 1943) was a German rower who competed in the 1928 Summer Olympics and in the 1932 Summer Olympics.

In 1928 he was eliminated in the first repechage round of the single sculls event.

Four years later he won the silver medal as member of the German boat in the coxless fours competition. He was also part of the German boat which eliminated in the repechage of the eight event.

Personal life
Flinsch worked as a pilot for Lufthansa before the Second World War. During the war, he served as a test pilot in the Luftwaffe. On 3 February 1943, Flinsch lost control piloting a Heinkel He 177 bomber. He successfully bailed out of the aircraft, but did not open his parachute and was killed.

References

1903 births
1943 deaths
Olympic rowers of Germany
Rowers at the 1928 Summer Olympics
Rowers at the 1932 Summer Olympics
Olympic silver medalists for Germany
Olympic medalists in rowing
German male rowers
Medalists at the 1932 Summer Olympics
Lufthansa people
Luftwaffe pilots
German test pilots